Barilius pectoralis is a fish in genus Barilius of the family Cyprinidae. It is found in the Yamuna drainage in India.

References 

P
Fish described in 2012